Trevett Wakeham "Bill" Cutts (28 May 1914October 2003) was an Australian public servant and diplomat.

Educated at Melbourne High School and the University of Melbourne, Cutts joined the Department of External Affairs in 1946, after serving during World War II in the navy.

Cutts was Australian Ambassador to the Philippines from 1963 to 1966. During his time at the post, the two countries signed a free trade agreement granting each most-favoured-nation rights to the other.

References

1914 births
2003 deaths
Ambassadors of Australia to the Philippines
Ambassadors of Australia to the Soviet Union
High Commissioners of Australia to Malta
High Commissioners of Australia to Pakistan
Consuls-General of Australia in San Francisco
University of Melbourne alumni
People educated at Melbourne High School